John Grimston, 6th Earl of Verulam (17 July 1912 – 15 April 1973), styled the Honourable John Grimston until 1960, was a British peer and Conservative Member of Parliament (MP).

Early life
He was born John Grimston on 17 July 1912 in St Albans, Hertfordshire. The future Lord Verulam was the second son of James Grimston, 4th Earl of Verulam and Lady Violet Constance Maitland Brabazon. He was educated at Oundle School and Christ Church, Oxford. He was a tobacco farmer in Southern Rhodesia for two years before becoming director and general manager of Enfield Rolling Mills in 1938.

Royal Air Force
Verulam joined the Royal Air Force Reserve of Officers in 1930 as a pilot, and he was injured in an aircraft accident in 1933. In 1937 he joined the Auxiliary Air Force and served in Coastal Command during World War II as a pilot.

Politician
He was elected to the House of Commons as MP for St Albans at the by-election in 1943, but was defeated at the 1945 general election by the Labour candidate Cyril Dumpleton. However, he ousted Dumpleton from the seat at the 1950 general election, and held it until he retired from the House of Commons at the 1959 general election. In 1960 he succeeded his elder brother in the earldom and entered the House of Lords.

Family
Lord Verulam married Marjorie Ray Duncan, daughter of Walter Atholl Duncan and Clara Ray née Parks, in 1938. The couple had five children, listed below. He died in April 1973, aged 60, and was succeeded in his titles by his only son.
Lady Elizabeth Harriot Grimston (1939-1987); married to Viscount Pollington (who later became, in 1980, The 8th Earl of Mexborough; b. 1931), divorced in 1972; two children.
Lady Hermione Frances Grimston (b. 1941)
Lady Romayne Bryony Grimston (b. 1946)
John Duncan Grimston, 7th Earl of Verulam (b. 1951); married to Dione Smith, 4 children including the heir apparent Viscount Grimston
Lady Iona Charlotte Grimston (b. 1953); second wife of The 8th Marquess Conyngham, an Anglo-Irish peer who owns Slane Castle.

Notes

References
Kidd, Charles, Williamson, David (editors). Debrett's Peerage and Baronetage (1990 edition). New York: St Martin's Press, 1990.

External links 
 

1912 births
1973 deaths
Deputy Lieutenants of Hertfordshire
6
John
Grimston, John
Grimston, John
Grimston, John
Grimston, John
Grimston, John
UK MPs who inherited peerages
People educated at Oundle School
Alumni of Christ Church, Oxford
Royal Air Force officers
English aviators
Royal Air Force pilots of World War II